The 28th Rhythmic Gymnastics European Championships was held in Nizhny Novgorod, Russia from May 29  to June 3, 2012.

Medal winners

Source:

Results

Seniors

Individual all-around

Group all-around

Group 5 balls

Group 3 ribbons + 2 hoops

Juniors

Team

Hoop

Ball

Clubs

Ribbon

Medal count

Seniors

Juniors

References

External links
European Championships Rhythmic Gymnastics Results
Rhythmic Gymnastics Results

European Rhythmic Gymnastics Championships
Rhythmic Gymnastics European Championships
2012 in Russian sport
International gymnastics competitions hosted by Russia